Rolvenden Layne is a hamlet within the civil parish of Rolvenden in the Ashford District of Kent, England. It is located approximately one mile (1.6 km) south of Rolvenden, with a public house, the Ewe & Lamb.

Rolvenden village originally consisted of the Streyte, located along what is now the A28 Ashford to Hastings road, which was almost entirely burned down in 1665, during the Great Plague (except for the church, pub and some farms). This caused the villagers to abandon the Streyte and move a mile down the hill to the common land of the Layne during the 1660s. Already located here was the Tudor house, now called Wesley House, where John Wesley later preached in the 18th century. The villagers later returned to rebuild the Streyte, resulting in the two small hamlets, the Streyte and the younger, smaller and quieter Layne that you see today.

Rolvenden is now approximately ten square miles in area, consisting largely of farming and rural activities, with an increasing number of professional, craft and tourist services. Rolvenden Layne is within the High Weald Area of Outstanding Natural Beauty, the South Kent development area and is also a conservation area.

Frances Hodgson Burnett rented Great Maytham Hall, located between Rolvenden and Rolvenden Layne, in 1898 and a blocked-up door in the old walled garden inspired her to write "The Secret Garden". After her departure in 1907 the mansion was rebuilt by Edwin Lutyens, including several other buildings previously or still on the estate (for example, the listed houses of Maytham Cottages, Frogs Lane, Rolvenden Layne, which used to be the laundry buildings of the estate).

While Rolvenden Layne benefits from easy access to the A28 at Rolvenden, to the facilities at Tenterden, shopping centres at Tunbridge Wells, Maidstone, Ashford and Hastings and quick and easy access to London via the railway stations at Headcorn and Staplehurst, it remains a very quiet and peaceful village. The only noises you may hear are the nostalgic sounds of the steam trains as the Kent and East Sussex Railway wends its way round the village and the occasional summer evening chorus of frogs from the local ponds.

The actor Ian Holm lived in Rolvenden Layne

External links

 British Listed Buildings - Wesley House
 'Parishes: Rolvenden', The History and Topographical Survey of the County of Kent: Volume 7 (1798), pp. 183-200.

Borough of Ashford
Hamlets in Kent